Holger Rune defeated Botic van de Zandschulp in the final by retirement, 3–4 to win the singles tennis title at the 2022 Bavarian International Tennis Championships. It was his maiden ATP Tour title, and he became the first Dane to win an ATP title since Kenneth Carlsen at 2005 Memphis.

Nikoloz Basilashvili was the defending champion, but lost to Miomir Kecmanović in the quarterfinals.

Van de Zandschulp became the first Dutch finalist at an ATP Tour event since Robin Haase in 2016 Gstaad.

Seeds
The top four seeds received a bye into the second round.

Draw

Finals

Top half

Bottom half

Qualifying

Seeds

Qualifiers

Lucky losers

Draw

First qualifier

Second qualifier

Third qualifier

Fourth qualifier

References

External links
Main draw
Qualifying draw

2022 ATP Tour
Singles